Irvington Road station is a SEPTA Media-Sharon Hill Trolley Line stop in Drexel Hill, Pennsylvania. It is officially located near Irvington and Hillcrest Roads, but in reality it is nearly halfway between Hillcrest and Garrett Roads on Irvington Road. It serves both Routes 101 and 102, and only local service is provided on both lines. Irvington Road is the next to last stop where Routes 101 and 102 share the same right-of-way.

Trolleys arriving at this station travel between 69th Street Terminal in Upper Darby and either Orange Street in Media for the Route 101 line, or Sharon Hill for the Route 102 line. The station provides platforms with a bench, but no shelters, unlike the nearby Drexel Hill Junction. Because the stop is in a residential area, there is no parking available.

Station layout

External links

SEPTA Route 101/102 Irvington Road (SubwayNut.com)
 Station from Irvington Road entrance from Google Maps Street View

SEPTA Media–Sharon Hill Line stations